Bayanoteuthis is a genus of belemnite, an extinct group of cephalopods. It dates from the Eocene, tens of millions of years after the rest of the group went extinct.

See also

 Belemnite
 List of belemnites

References

Belemnites